Iván Andre Luquetta Tuñón (May 5, 1996) is an American soccer player who plays as a forward for Charlotte Independence in the USL League One.

Career

Charlotte Independence
On March 3, 2022, Luquetta signed with USL League One club Charlotte Independence.

References

1996 births
Living people
Association football forwards
L.D. Alajuelense footballers
Barranquilla F.C. footballers
Atlético Junior footballers
Atlético Huila footballers
Patriotas Boyacá footballers
Charlotte Independence players
Expatriate footballers in Peru
Expatriate footballers in Costa Rica
Soccer players from Texas
Categoría Primera A players
Categoría Primera B players
Peruvian Primera División players
USL League One players
American soccer players